Penilia avirostris is a species of ctenopod in the family Sididae. It is found in temperate Asia, Europe, and New Zealand.

Sea Temperature Influence

Penilia avirostris live in waters around 18°C, but can live in waters from 12°c to 30°c. However, The increase in temperatures in the North Sea allow Penilia avirostris to thrive, having its populations dramatically grow in 2002 and 2003.

References

Further reading

 

Cladocera
Articles created by Qbugbot
Crustaceans described in 1849